This is a list of airlines currently operating in South Africa.

Commercial Airlines

Charter Airlines

Cargo Airlines

See also
 List of defunct airlines of South Africa
 List of airports in South Africa

References

South Africa
Airlines
Airlines
South Africa